Bryce Kanights is an American photographer and former professional skateboarder internationally recognized for his photographs of skateboarding.

Career 
Kanights grew up in San Francisco, California, photographing and skateboarding throughout the city. Kanights was the first skateboarder to be sponsored by Billabong but earned very little money from the sponsorship and his photography continued to be his primary source of income. Kanights worked for Thrasher for many years. As he describes on his website, he started shooting his first photographs as a teenager, when he was skateboarding in San Francisco. Since then his passion for photography only grew, until he was able to make it his job.

Career 
In his portfolio, Kanights has many big brands, such as:

Apple
Quiksilver
Hurley
Adidas
GoPro
Volcom
Vans
Levi's
ESPN
Konami
Oakley
Fox Racing
EA Sports
Bell Sports
Da Kine
Sutro Eyewear
Pro-Tec
Activision
Nike
Red Bull
Skully Candy
HUF
Alli Sports
Dew Tour
FTC. Stance
Street League
Monster Energy
Mountain Dew
VICE Media
Skateboarder
Kingpin
Juice
Thrasher

References 

Skate photographers
American skateboarders
Year of birth missing (living people)
Living people